The 2021 Houston Baptist Huskies baseball team represented Houston Baptist University during the 2021 NCAA Division I baseball season. The Huskies played their home games at Husky Field and were led by sixteenth–year head coach Jared Moon. They were members of the Southland Conference. On March 25, 2021, following the conclusion of the 2021 season, Jared Moon resigned from his head coaching duties after amassing an overall record of 401–441–2 in his sixteen seasons to take care of family matters.

Preseason

Southland Conference Coaches Poll
The Southland Conference Coaches Poll was released on February 11, 2021, and the Huskies were picked to finish thirteenth and last in the conference with 49 votes.

Preseason All-Southland Team & Honors

First Team
Ryan Flores (UIW, 1st Base)
Nate Fisbeck (MCNS, 2nd Base)
Beau Orlando (UCA, 3rd Base)
JC Correa (LAMR, Shortstop)
Gavin Johnson (SHSU, Catcher)
Clayton Rasbeary (MCNS, Designated Hitter)
Sean Arnold (UIW, Outfielder)
Brandon Bena (HBU, Outfielder)
Colton Cowser (SHSU, Outfielder)
Noah Cameron (UCA, Pitcher)
Will Dion (MCNS, Pitcher)
Kyle Gruller (HBU, Pitcher)
Conner Williams (UCA, Pitcher)
Itchy Burts (TAMUCC, Utility)

Second Team
Preston Faulkner (SELA, 1st Base)
Logan Berlof (LAMR, 2nd Base)
Anthony Quirion (LAMR, 3rd Base)
Reid Bourque (MCNS, Shortstop)
Chris Sandberg (NICH, Catcher)
Lee Thomas (UIW, Designated Hitter)
Josh Ragan (UCA, Outfielder)
Jack Rogers (SHSU, Outfielder)
Tyler Smith (NSU, Outfielder)
John Gaddis (TAMUCC, Pitcher)
Gavin Stone (UCA, Pitcher)
Luke Taggart (UIW, Pitcher)
Jeremy Rodriguez (SFA, Pitcher)
Jake Dickerson (MCNS, Utility)

Roster

Schedule and results

References

Houston Baptist Huskies
Houston Christian Huskies baseball seasons
Houston Baptist Huskies baseball